Calochortus luteus, the yellow mariposa lily, is a mariposa lily endemic to California.

Description
The  primarily bright deep yellow flower is 3–5 cm across and perianth bulb-shaped, lined red-brown inside, often also with central red-brown blotch and sparse hair inside. It is a perennial herb.

Distribution
This species is found on coastal prairie, grasslands and some open forest floors. Its range is along the coastal ranges from region to the northern Santa Barbara County Channel Islands and mainland, Northwestern California, the Sacramento Valley, and the Sierra Nevada foothills from there to the Tehachapi Mountains.

Cultivation
Calochortus luteus is used in landscape design, with  "non-habitat sourced" bulbs available from native plant nurseries and societies, to grow as an ornamental plant in gardens and for restoration  projects.

References

External links

United States Department of Agriculture Plants Profile for Calochortus luteus
Caklphotos, University of California, Photo gallery — Calochortus luteus

luteus
Endemic flora of California
Flora of the Sierra Nevada (United States)
Natural history of the California chaparral and woodlands
Natural history of the California Coast Ranges
Natural history of the Central Valley (California)
Natural history of the San Francisco Bay Area
Garden plants of North America
Plants described in 1833
Flora without expected TNC conservation status